BBC Radio 6 Music is a British digital radio station owned and operated by the BBC, specialising primarily in alternative music. BBC 6 Music was the first national music radio station to be launched by the BBC in 32 years. It is available only on digital media: DAB radio, BBC Sounds, digital television, and throughout northern and western Europe through the Astra 2B satellite.

BBC 6 Music has been described as a "dedicated alternative music station". Many presenters have argued against the perception that the main focus is indie guitar music. The station itself describes its output as "the cutting edge music of today, the iconic and groundbreaking music of the past 40 years and unlimited access to the BBC's wonderful music archive". Since 2014, an annual music festival, 6 Music Festival, has been held in different cities around the United Kingdom and broadcast live on the station.

In July 2010, the BBC Trust announced it had rejected a proposal by the BBC to close 6 Music to provide commercial rivals more room. The trust commented that the station was "well-liked by its listeners, was highly distinctive and made an important contribution". In 2018, 6 Music was the most listened-to digital-only radio station, with an average weekly audience of 2.53 million.

According to RAJAR, the station broadcasts to a weekly audience of 2.5 million with a listening share of 2.5% as of December 2022.

History 
BBC 6 Music was proposed in October 2000 as a "digital-only" radio station and named "Network Y". ("Network X" became BBC Radio 1Xtra and "Network Z" BBC 7).

The station opened at 7 am, Monday 11 March 2002, with a show presented by Phill Jupitus. At the start-up, presenters included Liz Kershaw, Andrew Collins, Tom Robinson, Gideon Coe, Janice Long, Chris Hawkins, Gary Burton, Craig Charles, Stuart Maconie, Brinsley Forde, Suggs, Clare McDonnell, Bruce Dickinson, Tracey MacLeod, Sean Hughes, and Bob Harris. The first record played was Ash's Burn Baby Burn
6 Music attracted criticism for changing daytime schedules during late 2007 and early 2008. In response, Lesley Douglas, Controller of BBC Radio 2 and 6 Music at the time, said that the changes were intended to attract more female listeners. She claimed that "men tend to be more interested in the intellectual side of the music, the tracks, where albums have been made, that sort of thing". This in turn brought on more criticism of perceived sexism on Douglas' part.

In March 2006, BBC 6 Music moved from Broadcasting House to new studios in the adjacent Wogan House (then called Western House) to allow the regeneration of Broadcasting House.
	
In 2011, BBC Radio 6 Music started the process of moving some of its presenters, staff, and shows from London and elsewhere to the new studios at MediaCityUK in Salford near Manchester. The studios are located on the ground floor of Dock House. Among programmes broadcast there are Radcliffe & Maconie, The Craig Charles Funk and Soul Show, and Marc Riley's and Mary Anne Hobbs' shows.

Proposed closure 

In February 2010, in anticipation of a review by the BBC Trust, newspaper reports suggested 6 Music might be axed. The review stopped short of recommending closure but noted that only one in five UK residents were aware the station existed, and that it lacked presenters with credibility as music experts. The Times claimed that Mark Thompson, Director General of the BBC, proposed closure as part of a bid to scale back BBC operations and allow commercial rivals more room. A high-profile campaign to oppose closure of the station attracted media attention and led to "#SaveBBC6Music" quickly becoming a trending topic on Twitter. A leading voice in the campaign was Jarvis Cocker, the lead singer for the British band Pulp who presented his own show on BBC 6 Music, Jarvis Cocker's Sunday Service. A Facebook group set up to oppose the proposed closure gained nearly 180,000 members. A campaign was launched to get the song "Joy Division Oven Gloves" by Half Man Half Biscuit to No. 6 in the UK Singles Chart on 12 April 2010; it entered the Singles Chart that week at No. 56 and the Independent Singles Chart at No. 3.

The Sunday Times reported that following the public outcry over the proposed closure, 6 Music would be rebranded as Radio 2 Extra, retaining a similar playlist but broadcasting for only 12 hours a day but Tim Davie, head of audio and music at the BBC, denied this was a possibility.

Five months after rumours of closure first emerged, the BBC Trust announced that it was not convinced by the BBC Executive's plans and that the station would not be closed.

In the first quarter of 2011 some BBC radio services, including 6 Music, were part of an efficiency review conducted by John Myers. His role, according to Andrew Harrison, the chief executive of RadioCentre, was "to identify both areas of best practice and possible savings." The Telegraph suggested that this was due to 'commercial sector criticism' whilst The Guardian cited a National Audit Office report.

BASCA was actively circulating petitions challenging the BBC's plan to close down 6 Music.

Statistics

Ratings and listenership
In February 2010, 6 Music was reported as showing growth in its audience, winning an audience of 695,000 listeners over the first quarter, up 12.3% year-on-year. However, in the quarter to December 2009, its 'reach' (proportion of the adult population who listen for at least 5 minutes in the course of an average week) was 1%, and Total Survey Area share (of total listening time) was 0.4%.

According to the BBC's service review of Radio 2 and 6 Music, published in February 2010, the average age of 6 Music listeners was 36, which led the authors to suggest more might be done to attract older listeners, considering the station played a broad range of music from the 1960s to the present day. The review also claimed that the deficiency in appeal to female listeners apparent in 2007 was still in existence, and that there should be changes to attract more listeners from ethnic minorities and lower income groups. However, the review did not give details of the scale of these issues.

Following the proposal to close the station, online listening figures rose significantly. The number of weekly unique online listeners rose to an average of 133,653 in March 2010, up 50 per cent on the previous March. When the RAJAR listening figures were released in May 2010, it was revealed that 6 Music had an average of 1.02 million listeners in the first three months of the year, compared to 695,000 the previous year.

In 2011, 6 Music had a total audience of 1.3 million listeners in the three months to 27 March, up from 1.14m in the previous quarter, according to the latest data from the Radio Joint Audience Research (RAJAR) board. Buoyed by shows from high-profile DJs such as Jarvis Cocker, Huey Morgan and Lauren Laverne, 6 Music has also grown its audience from 1.02m in the first quarter of 2010. The station broke more records in 2012, with a total audience of 1.62 million in the third quarter of the year. For the last month of 2012 RAJAR reported 6 Music listening figures had overtaken BBC Radio 4 Extra to become the most listened to digital only radio station in the United Kingdom. The same report also showed that 6 Music had surpassed BBC Radio 3 in listening share, an increase of 31% from the year previously.

In 2014, a report was released stating that BBC Radio 6 Music had overtaken BBC Radio 3 in numbers of listeners per week for the first time. The digital station's weekly average was 1.89m listeners (up 5.5% on 2013) while BBC Radio 3's average weekly listenership was 1.884m.

In 2018, BBC Radio 6 Music was the 10th most popular radio station as measured by weekly reach – between Talksport and Absolute Radio – and the 6th most popular as measured by listener hours – between BBC Radio 5 Live and Kiss.

Press coverage

Nominations and awards
Several of BBC 6 Music's presenters and shows have won Sony Radio Academy Awards. In 2006 presenter Marc Riley won a Silver award for The Music Radio Personality of the Year. In April 2008, comedy duo Adam and Joe's 6 Music Saturday morning show won the Broadcasting Press Guild award for Radio Programme of the Year. George Lamb also won the Sony 'Rising Star' award. In May 2009, Adam and Joe won three Sony Radio Silver awards.

Following the announcement that 6 Music was to be closed, Adam and Joe won the best comedy prize at the Sony Radio Academy Awards in May 2010, with Jarvis Cocker winning the rising star award, voted for by listeners, for their 6 Music shows. Two years later, the station was named UK Station of the Year at the Sonys, with the judges citing its "confidence across its schedule that not only reflects a real passion for music but also a firm understanding of the audience they are broadcasting to."

Controversies
In 2007 BBC 6 Music was in the press because of scandals over rigged competitions. It emerged that in 2006 the Liz Kershaw Show faked a competition by using producers and their friends as 'competition winners', leading to the firing of a junior producer. On 20 September 2007, it was announced that the Head of Programmes, Ric Blaxill, had resigned.

In May 2008 George Lamb was reprimanded for using his programme to back Conservative candidate Boris Johnson for London mayor.

Events

6 Music Festival
In January 2014 the BBC launched 6 Music Festival, a new music festival featuring artists that "share the alternative spirit of the network". The festival takes place in a different city each year, with the first edition held in Manchester in February 2014 and headlined by Damon Albarn. Tickets sold out in six minutes for the event, but Albarn's headline set was criticised and it was claimed that the festival "just didn't work".

6 Music Festival returned in 2015 in Newcastle upon Tyne and Gateshead, with performances from Neneh Cherry, Royal Blood, The Charlatans and Hot Chip. The festival was praised as a "triumphant celebration of the left-field", and compared favourably to the 2014 event. The 2016 event was held across three venues in Bristol with performances from Foals and Bloc Party. The daily capacity was 5,000.

The 2017 edition took place in March 2017 (unlike previous festivals which took place in February) in Glasgow, and included major sets from Future Islands, Sparks, Depeche Mode, The Shins and Belle and Sebastian. It again included evening gigs, daytime gigs, talks and screenings. No festival took place in 2018. However, the station did curate the Belfast event of the Biggest Weekend.

The 2019 edition of the festival took place in Liverpool. It ran for three days across four different venues and included sets from The Good, The Bad & The Queen, Anna Calvi, John Grant, Idles, Fontaines D.C. and She drew the gun.

The 2020 edition took place at the Roundhouse in Chalk Farm, London, England, immediately north of Camden Town, in the London Borough of Camden.

The 2022 edition took place in Cardiff. Róisín Murphy headlined the Saturday night event.

The 2023 BBC Radio 6 Music Festival will take place in Manchester at the O2 Victoria Warehouse (headline acts), Band on the Wall (BBC Music Introducing showcases) and RAMONA (DJ mix show). Acts taking part include Tim Burgess, Christine and the Queens, Hot Chip, Lava La Rue, Phoebe Green, Antony Szmierek, Afflecks Palace, Arlo Parks and The Big Moon.

Presenters

 Afrodeutsche
 Craig Charles
 Gideon Coe
 Matt Everitt
 Guy Garvey
 Chris Hawkins
 Mary Anne Hobbs
 Steve Lamacq
 Amy Lamé
 Lauren Laverne
 Don Letts
 Stuart Maconie
 Cerys Matthews
 Huey Morgan
 Gilles Peterson
 Iggy Pop
 Mark Radcliffe
 Tom Ravenscroft
 Marc Riley
 Tom Robinson
 Jamz Supernova
 The Blessed Madonna

Stand-in presenters

 Gemma Cairney
 DJ Paulette
 Ezra Furman
 Vic Galloway
 Nabihah Iqbal
 Annie Mac
 Cillian Murphy
 Nemone
 Bill Nighy
 Katie Puckrik
 Huw Stephens

Station management

Current
 Paul Rodgers – Head of 6 Music, 2016–present previously Editor, 2008–2012, and Head of Programmes, 2013–2016
 Bob Shennan – Network Controller, Radio 2 and 6 Music, 2009–2016
 James Stirling – Head of Programmes, 6 Music, 2012–
 Jeff Smith – Head of Music, Radio 2 and 6 Music / head of the weekly playlist meeting
 Lorna Clarke – Network Manager, Radio 2 and 6 Music, 2010–present

Former
 Lesley Douglas – Network Controller, Radio 2 and 6 Music, 2004–2008
 Ric Blaxill – Head of Programmes, 2004–2007

Notes

External links

BBC The Joy Of 6 Music

 
6 Music
Radio stations established in 2002
2002 establishments in the United Kingdom
Radio stations in the United Kingdom
Digital-only radio stations
Adult album alternative radio stations